Plimsoll is a surname. Notable people with the surname include:

 James Plimsoll (1917–1987), Australian diplomat and public servant
 John Plimsoll (1917–1999), South African cricketer 
 Samuel Plimsoll (1824–1898), English politician and social reformer